Günter Kilian (born 29 January 1950) is a German water polo player. He competed at the 1968 Summer Olympics and the 1976 Summer Olympics.

See also
 Germany men's Olympic water polo team records and statistics
 List of men's Olympic water polo tournament goalkeepers
 List of World Aquatics Championships medalists in water polo

References

External links
 

1950 births
Living people
Sportspeople from Würzburg
German male water polo players
Water polo goalkeepers
Olympic water polo players of West Germany
Water polo players at the 1968 Summer Olympics
Water polo players at the 1976 Summer Olympics